(Danish for "Turkish pepper", often referred to as  in Finnish,  in German,  in Norwegian and  in Swedish) is a salty liquorice candy flavoured with salmiac (ammonium chloride), produced by the Finnish company Fazer and popular in Northern Europe.  was originally invented by  in 1976 in Jutland, Denmark and was originally made by the Danish company Perelly, before the company was acquired by Fazer.

The basic variant is a large, hollow round shell both coated and filled with ammonium chloride powder. It is sold in dark blue, flame-decorated bags. The  product family has later expanded to include the "Hot & Sour" (a milder variant of the traditional design, produced in four different flavours; Spicy Citrus, Pepper Liquorice, Chilli Melon and Strawberry Surprise) and "Bonfire" (soft, much milder candies) bagged variants, as well as lollipops and filled liquorice. There has also been a chili-flavoured version and a strongly licorice-flavoured version with less of the ammonium chloride and peppercorn flavouring, but these have since been discontinued. However, the licorice-flavoured variant can still be found as one of the flavours in the “Hot & Sour” bags.

 is used to make the Finnish cocktail Salmiakki Koskenkorva and in similar Scandinavian cocktails.

 is hygroscopic, and if left in an unsealed bag it will absorb water from the air and stick together after a few days.

Tyrkisk peber products
Tyrkisk Peber Original, with 3 flames on them, sold in dark blue bags by Fazer Finland.
Tyrkisk Peber Filled Liquorice, with 1 flame on them, sold in dark blue bags by Fazer Finland.
Tyrkisk Peber Hot & Sour, with 2 flames on them, sold in light blue bags by Fazer Finland.
Tyrkisk Peber Firewood, with 2 flames on them, sold in light gray bags by Fazer Finland.
Tyrkisk Peber Volcano, with 3 flames on them, sold in red bags by Fazer Finland.
Tyrkisk Peber Hot Stones, with 3 flames on them, sold in black bags by Fazer Finland.
Tyrkisk Peber Soft Flames, with 1 flame on them, sold in turquoise bags by Fazer Finland.
Tyrkisk Peber Mega Hot, with 4 flames on them, sold in red bags by Fazer Finland.
Tyrkisk Peber Fire Balls, with 4 flames on them, sold in red bags by Fazer Finland.
Tyrkisk Peber Ekstra Hot, with 0 flames on them, sold in dark blue bags by Fazer Finland.
Tyrkisk Peber with 1 flame on them, sold in pink-purple bags by Fazer Finland.
Trimex Tyrkisk Peber, Türkisch Pfeffer ECHT STARK, a Tyrkisk Peber hard candy, is the only Tyrkisk Peber, Turkish Papper from Denmark and made by a Danish Company Trimex from Denmark.
Milk chocolate with SALTY LIQUORICE  CANDY, Milk chocolate bar with small pieces of Tyrkisk Peber throughout, sold in blue wrapping by Fazer Finland

External links
https://www.fazer.com/products/our-international-brand-selection/tyrkisk-peber/  Manufactures product page

Brand name confectionery
Finnish confectionery
Liquorice (confectionery)
Danish confectionery
Fazer